Ethan Chorin is a Middle East and Africa-focused scholar and entrepreneur. He is known as a leading analyst of Libyan affairs, and for his applied development work in the Middle East and Africa, in the area of environmental science and healthcare.

Career 
Chorin began his career as a business developer with Shell Oil.  In 2004 he joined the U.S. Foreign Service, and was one of a small number of U.S. diplomats posted to Libya (2004-2006) immediately following the U.S. rapprochement with Gaddafi c. 2004.  He served in Libya as the Economic and Commercial attaché from 2004-2006,  and was subsequently posted to Washington, D.C. and the United Arab Emirates. From 2008-2011 he was Senior Manager for Communications, and then Government Relations, at Dubai Ports World (DP World), and was head of the company’s Corporate Social Responsibility (CSR) Program from 2009-2011.

Chorin returned to Libya in July, 2011 as co-founder of the 501c(3) non-profit Avicenna Group, to assist with post-revolutionary medical capacity-building. As part of this effort, he recruited Massachusetts General Hospital (MGH) to work with Benghazi Medical Center (BMC, on a program to build trauma capacity in Benghazi.  The MOU for this project was signed a day before the September 11, 2012 attack on the U.S. consulate in Benghazi. Ambassador Christopher Stevens, was to visit BMC to express support for the project the following day.  Chorin has written several pieces on the impact of that attack on U.S. foreign policy in the region.

Chorin was a Director at Berkeley Research Group (BRG) from 2012-2013, before founding Perim Associates, which advises international law firms and governments. As CEO of Perim Associates, Chorin created the 2015 ministerial East Africa Environmental Risk & Opportunity “ERO” Summit, held in Djibouti, and hosted by the President of the Republic of Djibouti. Yale University Climate and Energy Center played a prominent role in the conference, which was highlighted by Secretary of State John Kerry in a Djibouti press conference. He served as Sr. Advisor to the Ministry of Foreign Affairs of the United Arab Emirates, 2020-2021.

Chorin has spoken and testified on Libya before bodies such as the NATO Parliamentary Assembly and the U.S. Congress. He has been a frequent commentator on Libya for the BBC.

Books 

Chorin has written three books. Translating Libya (2008, Saqi Books-SOAS) is known as one of the most significant English language sources on Libyan short fiction. It is a collection of translations of 16 short stories set in various locations in Libya, interspersed with Chorin’s travelogue and social commentary. Darf Publishers published an expanded edition in 2015 with a foreword by Libyan novelist Ahmed Ibrahim Fagih.”

Chorin’s second book, Exit the Colonel: The Hidden History of the Libyan Revolution, traces the origins of the 2011 Libyan Revolution. Libya historian Dirk Vandewalle called Exit The Colonel “undoubtedly...the best analytical work on Libya and its revolution for a very long time. "Middle East constitutional lawyer and ex-Lebanese Presidential candidate Chibli Mallat noted that Chorin had “reconstructed the murky events (of the first few days of the Revolution) in remarkable detail.”

His most recent book is Benghazi!  A New History of the Fiasco that Pushed America and Its World to the Brink (Hachette, 2022), which provides the broader context, and details the larger causes and long-term consequences of the 2012 attack on the US diplomatic mission in Benghazi, Libya.

Education and awards 
Chorin holds a Ph.D. from U.C. Berkeley in Agricultural and Resource Economics (2000). Chorin received a master's degree from Stanford University in International Policy Studies (1993) and a bachelor's degree from Yale University in Near Eastern Literature and Civilizations (1991), cum laude, with Distinction in the major

Chorin was a Fulbright Fellow in Amman, Jordan (1994-1995), an IIE Fulbright Hays Doctoral Research Fellow in Aden, Yemen (1998-1999), and a Jean Monnet Fellow at the Ecole polytechnique, France (1993-1994)

Chorin has been a Social Enterprise Fellow at the Yale School of Management (SOM) (2012), a Non-Resident Fellow at the Dubai School of Government (2009-2011), He was a member of the 2008 Obama Campaign’s Foreign Policy Advisory Group. He was recipient of a U.S. Department of State Meritorious Honor Award for his work in Libya, and a Sinclaire Award for language achievement in Persian

Chorin was born New York City, and grew up in Berkeley, California. He is the son of mathematician Alexander Joel Chorin and Alice Jones Chorin.

Books authored

Articles 
 Chorin, Ethan, Benghazi's Karmic Revenge - FORBES Nov 20, 2016
 Chorin, Ethan, “Articulating a Dubai Model of Development: The Case of Djibouti, Dubai School of Government, 2010  (monograph)
 Chorin, Ethan, NATO’s Libya Intervention and the continued case for a Responsibility to Rebuild, in In Boston University International Law Journal, Summer, 2013.
 Chorin, Ethan, The Future of the U.S.-Libya Commercial Relationship, in Vandewalle, Dirk, Libya since 1969:  Qadhafi’s Revolution Revisited, Palgrave-MacMillan, 2008: New York
 Chorin, Ethan, “What Libya Lost”, in the New York Times, September 13, 2012 : https://www.nytimes.com/2012/09/14/opinion/what-libya-lost-when-ambassador-stevens-died.html?_r=0
 Chorin, Ethan, The Deeper Blame for Benghazi.” In the New York Times, May 14, 2013: https://www.nytimes.com/2013/05/14/opinion/the-deeper-blame-for-benghazi.html
 Chorin, Ethan “The New Danger in Benghazi”, in the New York Times, May 28, 2014: https://www.nytimes.com/2014/05/28/opinion/the-new-danger-in-benghazi.html
 Chorin, Ethan, “The New Pirates of Libya” in Foreign Policy, March 2, 2015 https://foreignpolicy.com/2015/03/03/the-new-pirates-of-libya/
 Chorin, Ethan, The U.S. Commercial Guide to Libya, U.S. Department of State, U.S. Department of Commerce, 2006  
 Chorin, Ethan, The Graffiti of Benghazi, in Words Without Borders, July, 2011: http://www.wordswithoutborders.org/dispatches/article/the-graffiti-of-benghazi
 Chorin, Ethan, “New Government May Cause Splits”, in Prospect Magazine, August 14, 2015: http://www.prospectmagazine.co.uk/world/the-plan-for-peace-in-libya-could-cause-further-splits
 Chorin, Ethan, “Setting the Record Straight on Benghazi”, in Foreign Affairs, February 10, 2010.  https://www.foreignaffairs.com/articles/libya/2016-02-10/setting-record-straight-benghazi
 Chorin, Ethan,  “A Curious Twist of Fate for Libya and its Rogue General.” Forbes, December 22, 2015:  https://www.forbes.com/sites/ethanchorin/2015/12/22/a-curious-twist-of-fate-for-libya-and-its-rogue-general/#4844a28c672b
 Homeless rats: A parable for postrevolution libya | wordswithoutborders.org

References

American non-fiction writers
American environmentalists
Yale College alumni
Stanford University alumni
Living people
UC Berkeley College of Natural Resources alumni
1968 births
United States Foreign Service personnel
American chief executives